Max q is the maximum value of dynamic pressure associated with a body travelling through the atmosphere, typically a spacecraft during launch.

Max q or Max Q may also refer to:

 Max Q (astronaut band), a musical group from Houston, Texas, made up of NASA astronauts
 Max Q (Australian band), a musical group from the 1980s, fronted by Michael Hutchence of INXS
 Max Q (album), a 1989 studio album by Australian band Max Q.
 Max Q (film), a 1998 television movie about a fictional Space Shuttle disaster
 Max Q (quartet), the 2007 Barbershop Harmony Society International quartet champion
 Max Quordlepleen, a character in The Hitchhiker's Guide to the Galaxy
 Nvidia Max-Q, variants of graphics processing units (GPUs) with a lower thermal design power (TDP)
 Maritime Launch Services, a Canadian space transport services company that trades on the NEO Exchange under the symbol MAXQ
 Maxim MAXQ, a line of microcontrollers with a design based on the transport triggered architecture.

See also 

 Q-Max, a type of ship